Hall River may refer to:

North America
Halls Stream, a tributary of the Connecticut River, forming the boundary between Quebec (Canada) and New Hampshire (United States)

Canada
 Hall River (Bonaventure River), a tributary of the Bonaventure River in Gaspésie-Îles-de-la-Madeleine, Quebec
 Hall River West, a tributary of the Hall River

United States
 Hall River (Florida), Citrus County, Florida

New Zealand
Hall River (New Zealand)